The 1973 San Francisco State Gators football team represented California State University, San Francisco—now known as San Francisco State University—as a member of the Far Western Conference (FWC) during the 1973 NCAA Division II football season. Led by 13th-year head coach Vic Rowen, San Francisco State compiled an overall record of 7–2–1 with a mark of 3–2 in conference play, tying for third place in the FWC. For the season the team outscored its opponents 263 to 188. The Gators played home games at Cox Stadium in San Francisco.

Schedule

References

San Francisco State
San Francisco State Gators football seasons
San Francisco State Gators football